Knud Petersen (born 21 November 1934) is a Danish footballer. He played in one match for the Denmark national football team in 1957.

References

1934 births
Living people
Danish men's footballers
Denmark international footballers
Place of birth missing (living people)
Association footballers not categorized by position